St. James Chapel, also known as the St. James United Methodist Church, is a historic Methodist chapel located at St. James, Phelps County, Missouri.  It was built in 1868, and is a one-story red brick building with Gothic Revival and Romanesque Revival style design elements.  It measures 40 feet by 60 feet, and has a gable roof.  It features a bell tower topped by a dome.

It was listed on the National Register of Historic Places in 1970.

References

United Methodist churches in Missouri
Churches on the National Register of Historic Places in Missouri
Gothic Revival church buildings in Missouri
Romanesque Revival church buildings in Missouri
Churches completed in 1868
Buildings and structures in Phelps County, Missouri
National Register of Historic Places in Phelps County, Missouri